Vane Glacier is a broad glacier that drains the northeast slopes of Mount Murphy in Marie Byrd Land. It enters Crosson Ice Shelf between Eisberg Head and Boyd Head. It was mapped by the United States Geological Survey (USGS) from surveys and U.S. Navy air photos, 1959–66, and was named by the Advisory Committee on Antarctic Names (US-ACAN) for Gregg A. Vane, a U.S. Exchange Scientist at the Soviet station Novolazarevskaya Station in 1972.

References

Glaciers of Marie Byrd Land